The 2013 Fifth Third Bank Tennis Championships was a professional tennis tournament played on outdoor hard courts. It was the 18th edition for men and the 16th edition for women of the tournament and was part of the 2013 ITF Women's Circuit and the 2013 ATP Challenger Tour, offering prize money of $50,000 each for the men's and women's events. It took place in Lexington, Kentucky, United States, on July 22–28, 2013.

ATP singles main draw entrants

Seeds

 As of July 15, 2013

Other entrants
The following players received wildcards into the singles main draw:
  Eric Quigley
  Alexis Musialek
  Filip Peliwo
  Mitchell Krueger

The following players received entry by a special exempt:
  Austin Krajicek
  Benjamin Mitchell

The following players received entry from the qualifying draw:
  Greg Jones
  Greg Ouellette
  Tennys Sandgren
  Ilija Bozoljac

WTA singles main draw entrants

Seeds

 1 Rankings as of July 15, 2013

Other entrants
The following players received wildcards into the singles main draw:
  Stephanie Kent
  Jamie Loeb
  Grace Min

The following players received entry from the qualifying draw:
  Jennifer Brady
  Lauren Embree
  Mari Osaka
  Naomi Osaka

The following player received entry by a lucky loser spot:
  Yana Koroleva
  Alexandra Mueller

Champions

Men's singles

  James Ward def.  James Duckworth 4–6, 6–3, 6–4

Women's singles

  Shelby Rogers def.  Julie Coin 6–4, 7–6(7–3)

Men's doubles

  Frank Dancevic /  Peter Polansky vs.  Bradley Klahn /  Michael Venus 7–5, 6–3

Women's doubles

  Nicha Lertpitaksinchai /  Peangtarn Plipuech def.  Julia Glushko /  Chanel Simmonds 7–6(7–5), 6–3

External links
 Official website

2013
2013 ATP Challenger Tour
2013 ITF Women's Circuit